"Arms Around Your Love" is the third single from Chris Cornell's second solo album, Carry On. It was released on May 21, 2007.

In the UK, the song peaked at number 177. The video was also released in Canada, where the song received airplay on MuchMoreMusic.

Track listing

Chart positions

References

2007 singles
Chris Cornell songs
Song recordings produced by Steve Lillywhite
Songs written by Chris Cornell
2007 songs